The 2004 Prix de l'Arc de Triomphe was a horse race held at Longchamp on Sunday 3 October 2004. It was the 83rd running of the Prix de l'Arc de Triomphe.

The winner was Bago, a three-year-old colt trained in France by Jonathan Pease. The winning jockey was Thierry Gillet.

Race details
 Sponsor: Groupe Lucien Barrière
 Purse: €1,600,000; First prize: €914,240 
 Going: Good
 Distance: 2,400 metres
 Number of runners: 19
 Winner's time: 2m 25.0s

Full result

 Abbreviations: shd = short-head; hd = head; snk = short-neck; nk = neck

Winner's details
Further details of the winner, Bago.
 Sex: Colt
 Foaled: 3 February 2001
 Country: France
 Sire: Nashwan; Dam: Moonlight's Box (Nureyev)
 Owner / Breeder: Niarchos Family

References

External links
 Colour Chart – Arc 2004

Prix de l'Arc de Triomphe
 2004
Prix de l'Arc de Triomphe
Prix de l'Arc de Triomphe
Prix de l'Arc de Triomphe